Dermatolepis dermatolepis, the leather bass is a species of marine ray-finned fish, a grouper from the subfamily Epinephelinae which is part of the family Serranidae, which also includes the anthias and sea basses. It is a predatory reef fish which is found in the eastern Pacific Ocean.

Description
Dermatolepis dermatolepis has a body which is at least twice as deep as its standard length which is at its deepest at the origin of the dorsal fin and laterally compressed. The dorsal profile of head is steep and the eye has a diameter which is less than the length of the snout. The caudal fin is rounded and the pectoral fins are short. The dorsal fin contains 11 spines and 18-20 soft rays while the anal fin has 3 spines and 9 soft rays. The adults have a greyish-brown body with alternating dark grey to blackish and white to pale grey bars mottled by many white to pale blotches. The margins of the fins have thin bands of yellow. The juveniles are black with narrow white stripes on the head and the body which extend onto the dorsal and anal fins with a white caudal fin which has black spots.

Distribution
Dermatolepis dermatolepis occurs in the eastern Pacific Ocean along the western coast of North and South America from southern California to Peru. They are also found on the Galapagos Islands, the Revillagigedo Islands, Cocos Island and Clipperton Island.

Habitat and biology
Dermatolepis dermatolepis is a species of coral and rocky reefs down to at least  and is likely to be found at much greater depths. The small juveniles may use the long spines of the sea urchins Centrostephanus and Diadema for shelter. It is a diurnal predator which preys on small benthic fishes and sometimes on crustaceans. It will associate with browsing herbivorous fishes, hiding amongst them and feeding on the hidden animals  disturbed by these fish as they browse. They have also been recorded following moray eels as they forage, preying on fishes fleeing from the eel. This species forms schools and synchronized spawning aggregations made up of around 30 to 70 fishes. Spawning aggregations have been observed from late November until February over a seamount off Cocos Island. They have also been observed spawning at Manuelita Island close to Cocos Island in late July. In the Revillagigedo Islands of Mexico spawning aggregations of 30-54 individuals have been recorded in February over a shallow seamount.

Taxonomy
Dermatolepis dermatolepis was originally described as Dermatolepis punctatus by the American ichthyologist Theodore Nicholas Gill (1837-1914) as the type species of the monotypic subgenus Dermatolepis of the genus Epinephelus with the type locality given as Cape San Lucas, Baja California in Mexico. This name was preoccupied by Holocentrus punctatus, a possible synonym of Epinephelus guttatus.

References

dermatolepis
Fish described in 1895